Joseph Pattison was an English professional footballer who played as a goalkeeper although, by 1939, he worked as a wool finisher in Haslingden.

References

People from Haslingden
English footballers
Association football goalkeepers
Burnley F.C. players
Accrington Stanley F.C. (1891) players
English Football League players
1912 births
1988 deaths